Pareiorhaphis ruschii is a species of catfish in the family Loricariidae. It is native to South America, where it is known only from Brazil, with its type locality being listed as the Piraquê-Açu River basin in the state of Espírito Santo. It was first collected from a shallow creek about 50 cm (19.7 inches) deep and 4 to 5 m (13 to 16 ft) wide. The species reaches 8.5 cm (3.3 inches) in standard length and is believed to be a facultative air-breather.

References 

Loricariidae
Fish described in 2012
Catfish of South America
Freshwater fish of Brazil